This filmography lists the film appearances of British-American actress Olivia de Havilland (1916–2020), as well as her television, stage, and radio credits. De Havilland's career spanned fifty-three years, from 1935 to 1988. During that time, she appeared in forty-nine feature films, and was one of the leading movie stars during the golden age of Classical Hollywood. She is best known for her early screen performances in The Adventures of Robin Hood (1938) and Gone with the Wind (1939), and her later award-winning performances in To Each His Own (1946), The Snake Pit (1948), and The Heiress (1949). De Havilland made her screen debut in Reinhardt's film adaptation A Midsummer Night's Dream in 1935. She began her career playing demure ingénues opposite popular leading men of that time, including Errol Flynn, with whom she made her breakout film Captain Blood in 1935. They would go on to make seven more feature films together, and became one of Hollywood's most popular romantic on-screen pairings.

De Havilland's range of performances included roles in most major movie genres. She achieved her initial popularity in romantic comedy films, such as The Great Garrick (1937) and Hard to Get (1938), and in Western adventure films, such as Dodge City (1939), Santa Fe Trail (1940), and They Died with Their Boots On. Her natural beauty and refined acting style made her particularly effective in historical dramas, such as Anthony Adverse (1936) and My Cousin Rachel (1952), and romantic drama films, such as Hold Back the Dawn (1941). In her later career, she was most successful in drama films, such as In This Our Life (1942) and Light in the Piazza (1962), and unglamorous roles in psychological dramas, such films as The Dark Mirror (1946) and Hush...Hush, Sweet Charlotte (1964).(1941) ‘Strawberry Blonde’

In addition to her active film career, deHavilland continued her work in the theatre, appearing three times on Broadway, in Romeo and Juliet (1951), Candida (1952), and A Gift of Time (1962) with Henry Fonda. She also worked in television, appearing in two successful miniseries, Roots: The Next Generations (1979) and North and South II (1986), and television feature films, such as Anastasia: The Mystery of Anna for which she received a Primetime Emmy Award nomination. During her career, deHavilland won two Academy Awards for To Each His Own and The Heiress, two Golden Globe Awards for The Heiress and Anastasia: The Mystery of Anna, two New York Film Critics Circle Awards for The Snake Pit and The Heiress, the National Board of Review Award for Best Actress and the Venice Film Festival Volpi Cup for The Snake Pit.

Filmography

Features

Short subjects

Television work

Stage appearances

Radio appearances

References

Citations

Bibliography

External links

 
 
 
 

Actress filmographies
American filmographies
British filmographies